The 2016–17 Guam Soccer League (Budweiser Soccer League for sponsorship reasons) is the 28th season of Guam Soccer League, Guam's First tier professional football league. Rovers are the defending champions.

Changes from last season

Team changes
The following teams had changed division since the 2016 season.

To Guam Soccer League
Promoted from 2015-16 Guam Second Division
 None
New clubs
 Haya United

From Guam Soccer League
Relegated to 2016-17 Guam Second Division
 Sidekicks
 Southern Cobras

Date and Venue
All matches were held in GFA Center Lower Field, Harmon from 8 October 2016 to 25 April 2017.

League table

Results

Season statistics

Top scorers

End of season
Rovers continue winning the league and qualified to AFC Cup. While, Haya United finished at the bottom with only 2 wins and 125 conceded goals.

Season awards

Golden Boot
 Min Sung Choi (Rovers)

Golden Gloves
 David Drews (Rovers)

Fair-play
Haya United

References

Guam Soccer League seasons
Guam